Cross My Heart may refer to:

 Sign of the cross, a Christian ritual blessing that gave rise to the oath "cross my heart and hope to die"

Film 
 Cross My Heart (1937 film), a British drama directed by Bernard Mainwaring
 Cross My Heart (1946 film), an American comedy directed by John Berry
 Cross My Heart (1987 film), an American romantic comedy directed by Armyan Bernstein
 Cross My Heart, a 2002 short film by Avie Luthra
 Cross My Heart (2017 film), a Canadian drama directed by Luc Picard

Music

Albums 
 Cross My Heart: An Introduction to Phil Ochs or the title song (see below), 2004
 Cross My Heart, an EP by Matthew Davidson, 2014

Songs 
 "Cross My Heart" (Eighth Wonder song), 1988
 "Cross My Heart" (Marianas Trench song), 2008
 "Cross My Heart" (Phil Ochs song), 1967
 "Cross My Heart" (Skepta song), 2010
 "Cross My Heart", by A-Teens from Pop 'til You Drop!
 "Cross My Heart", by Awaken the Empire
 "Cross My Heart", by Billy Stewart
 "Cross My Heart", by Brotherhood of Man from Oh Boy!
 "Cross My Heart", by Bruce Springsteen from Human Touch
 "Cross My Heart", by Carcass from Swansong
 "Cross My Heart", by Diana Ross from Red Hot Rhythm & Blues
 "Cross My Heart", by Edyta from Invisible
 "Cross My Heart", by Esham from Boomin' Words from Hell
 "Cross My Heart", by Everything but the Girl from Baby, the Stars Shine Bright
 "Cross My Heart", by Johnny Ace
 "Cross My Heart", by Killah Priest from Heavy Mental
 "Cross My Heart", by Melody's Echo Chamber from Bon Voyage
 "Cross My Heart", by The Rocket Summer from Calendar Days
 "Cross My Heart", by Sonny Boy Williamson from Down and Out Blues
 "Cross My Heart and Hope to Die", by Sentenced from The Cold White Light

Other uses 
 Cross My Heart (novel), a 2013 Alex Cross novel by James Patterson
 "Cross My Heart" (It's All Relative), a television episode

See also 
 "I Cross My Heart", a song by George Strait
 "I Cross My Heart", a song by All-4-One from On and On
 X My Heart (disambiguation)